Castel Ivano is a comune (municipality) in Trentino in the northern Italian region Trentino-Alto Adige/Südtirol. It was formed on 1 January 2016 as the merger of the previous communes of Strigno, Spera and Villa Agnedo. In July 2016 it also absorbed the commune of Ivano-Fracena.

It is located in Valsugana, midway between Borgo Valsugana and the boundary with Veneto.

Sights include the eponymous "Castel Ivano", a medieval fortress originally located in the frazione of Ivano-Fracena

References

External links
 Official website

Cities and towns in Trentino-Alto Adige/Südtirol